The 2011 Rivers State gubernatorial election was the 7th gubernatorial election of Rivers State. Held on April 26, 2011, the People's Democratic Party nominee Rotimi Amaechi won the election, defeating Celestine Omehia of the All Progressives Grand Alliance.

Results 
A total of 29 candidates contested in the election. Rotimi Amaechi from the People's Democratic Party won the election, defeating Celestine Omehia from the All Progressives Grand Alliance. Registered voters was 2,442,488, valid votes was 1,373,469, votes cast was 1,401,464, 27,995 votes was cancelled.

References 

Rivers State gubernatorial elections
Rivers gubernatorial
April 2011 events in Nigeria